Kirbymoorside railway station served the market town of Kirkbymoorside in North Yorkshire, England from 1874 until 1964.

History
It was opened on 1 January 1874. The regular passenger service (and the track east to Pickering) ceased in 1953 but freight traffic and occasional special passenger trains continued until 1964.

The station was host to a LNER camping coach from 1935 to 1939 and possibly one for some of 1934.

After closure the railway station building was used for industrial purposes, but was demolished between April/May 2010 in favour of a new housing development.

References

External links
 Kirbymoorside station on navigable 1955 O. S. map
 Kirbymoorside station at Disused Stations

Disused railway stations in North Yorkshire
Railway stations in Great Britain opened in 1874
Railway stations in Great Britain closed in 1964
Former North Eastern Railway (UK) stations
Kirkbymoorside